Adam Munro (born November 12, 1982) is a Canadian professional ice hockey goaltender currently playing for the Hamilton Steelhawks of the Allan Cup Hockey (ACH) league.

Playing career
Munro was drafted in the 1st round, 29th overall by the Chicago Blackhawks in the 2001 NHL Entry Draft. He was signed as free agent with HC Fribourg-Gotteron (Switzerland) on July 7, 2006.  He spent the 2007–08 season with the Columbus Blue Jackets' AHL affiliate, The Syracuse Crunch.

During the 2008–09 AHL season he played in the Toronto Marlies, the farm team for the Toronto Maple Leafs.

On October 15, 2009, Munro was re-signed by the Marlies under a professional try-out contract. He was released from his contract on November 17, 2009, but was re-signed by the Marlies on November 24, 2009. Munro was released again by the Marlies on January 12, 2010. Munro signed a contract with HC Sibir Novosibirsk of the Kontinental Hockey League on January 15, 2010.

In the 2013–14 season, with HC TWK Innsbruck, Munro was credited with a goal December 30, 2013, against the EHC Black Wings Linz.

On April 26, 2017, Munro was listed as one of the top 3 goalies in Erie Otters' History by The Hockey Writers.

On October 30, 2019, the Hamilton Steelhawks, of the Allan Cup Hockey league, announced that they had signed Munro for the 2019-2020 season.

References

External links

1982 births
Living people
Fehérvár AV19 players
Atlantic City Boardwalk Bullies players
Canadian ice hockey goaltenders
Chicago Blackhawks draft picks
Chicago Blackhawks players
Erie Otters players
Gwinnett Gladiators players
HC Fribourg-Gottéron players
HC TWK Innsbruck players
HC Sibir Novosibirsk players
National Hockey League first-round draft picks
Norfolk Admirals players
Sault Ste. Marie Greyhounds players
SG Cortina players
Syracuse Crunch players
Toronto Marlies players
Ice hockey people from Ontario
Sportspeople from the County of Brant
Canadian expatriate ice hockey players in Austria
Canadian expatriate ice hockey players in Hungary
Canadian expatriate ice hockey players in Italy
Canadian expatriate ice hockey players in Russia
Canadian expatriate ice hockey players in Switzerland